Nan Bao (男宝) is a formula of Chinese herbs purported to increase the male libido. It is available from a variety of suppliers in similar formulations.

The capsules typically contain an amount of icariin, a substance commonly derived from "Horny Goat Weed" leaf and considered an aphrodisiac.

Ingredients 
One formulation lists ingredients as follows:
 root of Panax Ginseng
 root of Dong Quai
 rhizome Curculigo
 root of Astragalus
 Poria sclerotium
 Psoralea fruit
 Rehmannia cured root tuber
 Bai-zhu atractylodes rhizome
 Cynomorium fleshy stem
 Palm-leaf Raspberry fruit
 Sichuan Teasel root
 Lycium fruit
 Tree Peony root bark
 Japanese Dodder seed
 Cassia bark
 Chinese Licorice root
 Morinda root
 Achyranthes root
 Fenugreek seed
 Cistanche tubulosa (Desert Broomrape) stem
 Epimedium ("Horny Goat Weed") leaf
 Ophiopogon tuber

References 

Herbs